The Hongmaogang Cultural Park is a cultural park in Siaogang District, Kaohsiung, Taiwan.

Name
Hongmao is a reference to the "red-haired" rulers of Dutch Formosa.

History
In 2007, the Hong Mao Gang Village was relocated from the original site in Siaogang District to make a way for Port of Kaohsiung Intercontinental Container Terminal. Using a small lot of land reserved, the cultural park was established there. It was opened in June 2012 after three years of renovation works.

Architecture

The park spans over an area of 3.42 hectares. It consists of Gaozi Tower Revolving Restaurant, exhibition hall, outdoor exhibition area, sky walk, pier and waiting Room and ocean front platform.

Transportation
The cultural park is accessible by bus from Siaogang Station of Kaohsiung MRT.

See also
 List of tourist attractions in Taiwan

References

External links

 

2012 establishments in Taiwan
Cultural centers in Kaohsiung
Event venues established in 2012